Thomas Francis Gibney (28 October 1887 – 4 April 1973) was an Australian rules footballer who played with Geelong in the Victorian Football League (VFL).

Notes

External links 

1887 births
1973 deaths
Australian rules footballers from Victoria (Australia)
Geelong Football Club players
Barwon Football Club players